The following list includes notable people who were born or have lived in Chicago, Illinois. For a similar list organized alphabetically by last name, see the category page People from Chicago, Illinois.

Academics, science, and engineering

Nobel laureates and Fields medalists 

 Michael Hudson (born 1939), economics professor

Authors and writers 

 Dean Baker (born 1958), macroeconomist

Business and philanthropy

Crime

Fine arts

Frontier

Media

Military

Music

Politics and law

Religion

Athletics

See also

References

	

People from Chicago
Chicago
Chicago